London was the name of a number of steamships, including:

, a London, Brighton and South Coast Railway steamship
, a steamship which sank in the Bay of Biscay in 1866

Ship names